Tomelloso Club de Fútbol was a Spanish football team based in Tomelloso, in the autonomous community of Castile-La Mancha. Founded in 1979 it played its home games at Estadio Municipal de Tomelloso, which has a capacity of 5,000 seats.

The club was finally dissolved in January 2015.

Season to season

8  seasons in Segunda División B
18 seasons in Tercera División

Notable former players
 Baba Sule
 Manuel Cabezas
 Javi Hernández
 Raúl Ibáñez
 Carlos Llorens
 Jorge Pinto
 Daniel Soria

External links
Official website 
Futbolme.com profile 

Football clubs in Castilla–La Mancha
Association football clubs established in 1979
1979 establishments in Spain
Association football clubs disestablished in 2015
Province of Ciudad Real